The Santomean passport is issued to citizens of São Tomé and Príncipe for international travel. As of 1 January 2018, Santomean citizens had visa-free or visa on arrival access to 58 countries and territories, ranking the Santomean passport 77th in terms of travel freedom (tied with Burkinabe passport) according to the Henley Passport Index.

See also
Visa requirements for Santomean citizens
 List of passports

References

Passports by country
Government of São Tomé and Príncipe